Daniel Mendick (born September 28, 1993) is an American professional baseball infielder for the New York Mets of Major League Baseball (MLB). He has previously played in MLB for the Chicago White Sox.

Amateur career
Mendick attended Pittsford Mendon High School in Pittsford, New York and had no college baseball scholarship offers out of high school. He started his college baseball career at Monroe Community College before transferring to the University of Massachusetts Lowell shortly after they became an NCAA Division I baseball program. He was drafted by the Chicago White Sox in the 22nd round of the 2015 Major League Baseball draft.

Professional career

Chicago White Sox 
Mendick made his professional debut with the Arizona League White Sox, hitting .256 with five home runs and 27 RBIs in 49 games. He played 2016 with the Kannapolis Intimidators (with whom he was named a South Atlantic League All-Star honors, Winston-Salem Dash and Charlotte Knights; in 115 games between the three clubs, he slashed .255/.326/.332 with two home runs and 36 RBIs. He played 2017 with Winston-Salem, earning Carolina League All-Star honors and the Birmingham Barons, hitting .256 with ten home runs and 51 RBIs in 125 games, and after the season played in the Arizona Fall League. Mendick played 2018 with Birmingham, batting .247 with 14 home runs and 59 RBIs in 132 games and earning a selection to the Southern League All-Star Game. He started 2019 with Charlotte.

On September 3, 2019, the White Sox selected Mendick's contract and promoted him to the major leagues. He made his major league debut that night versus the Cleveland Indians as a pinch runner. On September 8, Mendick hit his first major league home run off of Jaime Barría of the Los Angeles Angels.

Overall with the 2020 Chicago White Sox, Mendick batted .243 with three home runs and six RBIs in 33 games.

On May 17, 2021, Mendick hit his first career grand slam off of Derek Law of the Minnesota Twins. Overall in 2021, Mendick batted .220 with 2 Home Runs and 20 RBI's. He was added to the White Sox postseason roster in 2021.

Mendick tore his anterior cruciate ligament on June 22, 2022, ending his season. On November 18, he was non-tendered and became a free agent.

New York Mets 
On December 22, 2022, Mendick signed a one-year, $1 million contract with the New York Mets.

References

External links

1993 births
Living people
Sportspeople from Rochester, New York
Baseball players from New York (state)
Major League Baseball infielders
Chicago White Sox players
Monroe Tribunes baseball players
UMass Lowell River Hawks baseball players
Arizona League White Sox players
Kannapolis Intimidators players
Winston-Salem Dash players
Birmingham Barons players
Charlotte Knights players
Glendale Desert Dogs players
People from Pittsford, New York